Denis Joseph Rearden ( – 22 May 1885) was an Irish Liberal politician.

He was elected as the Member of Parliament (MP) for Athlone in 1865 but stood down at the next election in 1868.

Rearden was for some time a house agent and auctioneer in Piccadilly, London. He died at his home in Hendon, Middlesex in 1885, around 75 years old.

References

External links
 

1885 deaths
Irish Liberal Party MPs
UK MPs 1865–1868
Members of the Parliament of the United Kingdom for Athlone